Bath salts are water-soluble, pulverized minerals that are added to water to be used for bathing. They are said to improve cleaning, enhance the enjoyment of bathing, and serve as a vehicle for cosmetic agents. Bath salts have been developed which mimic the properties of natural mineral baths or hot springs. Some bath salts contain glycerine so the product will act as an emollient, humectant, or lubricant. Fragrances and colors are often added to bath salts; the fragrances are used to increase the users' enjoyment of the bathing experience.

Description

Substances often labeled as bath salts include magnesium sulfate (Epsom salts), sodium chloride (table salt), sodium bicarbonate (baking soda), sodium hexametaphosphate (Calgon, amorphous/glassy sodium metaphosphate), sodium sesquicarbonate, borax, and sodium citrate. Glycerin, or liquid glycerin, is another common ingredient in bath salts.  Depending on their properties, the additives can be classified as emollient, humectant or lubricant when used in bath salts products.

Fragrances and colors are often added to bath salts; in fact, one purpose of salts is as a vehicle or diluent to extend fragrances which are otherwise too potent for convenient use. Other common additives to bath salts are oils (agglomerating the salts to form amorphous granules, the product being called "bath beads" or "bath oil beads"), foaming agents, and effervescent agents. Bath salts may be packaged for sale in boxes or bags. Their appearance is often considered attractive or appealing, and they may be sold in transparent containers, showing off, for example, the needlelike appearance of sodium sesquicarbonate crystals.

History

The earliest systematic exposition of the different kinds of salts, their uses, and methods of extraction was published in China around 2700 BCE. Hippocrates encouraged his fellow healers to make use of salt water to heal various ailments by immersing their patients in sea water. The ancient Greeks continued this, and in 1753 English author and physician Charles Russel published "The Uses of Sea Water".

Effects

Some bath salts such as phosphates have a detergent action that softens calloused skin and aids in exfoliation (cleaning off dead skin cells). Some bath salts act as water softeners and change the way soap rinses. Some confusion may arise for bathers after their first experience in a bath with soft water. Soap does not lather well with hard water and can leave a sticky feeling. Soft water lathers better than hard water but feels slippery for a longer time during rinsing of soap, even though the soap is coming off faster, because the soap remains soluble.

High concentrations of salts increase the density of the water and increase buoyancy, which makes the body feel lighter in the bath. Very high concentrations of salts in water are used in many isolation tank therapies. Isolation tanks are special baths with enclosures which block out all light. Researchers have also studied their use in treating arthritis.

Bath fizzies

Bath fizzies are material products designed to effervesce in bathwater.  They come in the form of amorphous grains of homogeneous mixture, packaged in a box, jar, or envelope; single-use envelopes of mixed powders; and solid boluses of homogeneous or inhomogeneous mixture called bath bombs. Bath fizzies are a form of bath salts in that the products of their use include a salt solution in addition to the carbon dioxide bubbles which are their definitive feature.  Their ingredients must include one or more acid(s) and one or more water-soluble bicarbonate, sesquicarbonate, and/or carbonate.  In addition they commonly include coloring, fragrance, and/or other water-soluble, water-dispersible, and/or volatile ingredients for esthetic, cosmetic, or skin soothing purposes.  This principle of effervescing while releasing other ingredients is the same that has been used by tableted products for children to produce their own carbonated beverages.

Fake products used to disguise drugs

To evade drug laws, some companies sell a number of powdered recreational designer drugs in packages labelled "bath salts" . The name derives from instances in which the drugs were sold disguised as true bath salts, with the package claiming that the chemical was intended for use during bathing. The white powder, granules, or crystals often resemble true bath salts such as Epsom salts, but are very different chemically. The drugs' packaging often states "not for human consumption" in an attempt to circumvent drug prohibition laws. These fake bath salts are mainly sold in shops selling drug paraphernalia such as head shops.

Emollient bath additives as an eczema treatment
In 2018, a study of 483 children commissioned by the National Institute for Health and Care Research (NIHR) and published in The BMJ, found that bath oils used to help treat atopic eczema in children offered "no evidence of clinical benefit".

See also
 Balneotherapy
 Bubble bath
 Heubad
 Mud bath
 Sea bathing
 2-Aminoindane

References

External links
 

Aromatherapy
Balneotherapy
Bathing
Skin care

 Bath Salts in Research Chemicals